Karl Friedrich August Rammelsberg (1 April 1813 – 28 December 1899) was a German mineralogist from Berlin, Prussia.

Life 
After an apprenticeship in pharmacy, he studied chemistry and crystallography at the University of Berlin, where his influences were Eilhard Mitscherlich, Heinrich Rose, Christian Samuel Weiss and Gustav Rose. His graduate thesis in 1837 dealt with cyanogen, "De cyanogenii connubiis nonnullis". In 1841 he became a privatdozent at the university, and in 1845 was named an associate professor of inorganic chemistry. From 1850 he taught classes at the Gewerbeakademie, a vocational training academy that was a predecessor of the Technical University of Berlin. In 1874 he became a full professor of chemistry at the university and in 1883 was appointed director of the inorganic chemistry laboratory.

He distinguished himself with research in the fields of mineralogy, crystallography, analytical chemistry and metallurgy. He discovered the reducing action of hypophosphoric and phosphoric acids, and was the first scientist to determine the composition of Schlippe's salt (sodium thioantimonate). In addition, he made significant contributions in research involving isomorphism. He was the first scientist other than Mendeleyev to include his Periodic Table in a book, the fourth edition (1874) of Grundriss der chemie gemäss den neueren Ansichten, published in Berlin.

He described the minerals, magnesioferrite and tachyhydrite. Rammelsbergite, a nickel arsenide mineral, is named after him. He died at Gross Lichterfelde, southwest of Berlin

Published works 
Rammelsberg was the author of a series important textbooks, such as:
Handwörterbuch des chemischen Teils der Mineralogie (2 volumes, 1841; supplement 1843–53).
Lehrbuch der chemischen Metallurgie (1850).
Handbuch der Krystallographischen Chemie (1855).
Handbuch der Mineralchemie (1860).
Handbuch der Krystallographisch-physikalischen Chemie (2 volumes, 1881–82), some of the earlier works being incorporated in later and more comprehensive volumes with different titles.
He is also credited with providing translations of technical publications that were written in Italian, French and Swedish.

References

1813 births
1899 deaths
German mineralogists
19th-century German chemists
Members of the Prussian Academy of Sciences
Scientists from Berlin
People from the Province of Brandenburg
Humboldt University of Berlin alumni
Academic staff of the Humboldt University of Berlin
Foreign associates of the National Academy of Sciences
Members of the Göttingen Academy of Sciences and Humanities